The Most Dangerous Man in America: Daniel Ellsberg and the Pentagon Papers is a 2009 documentary film directed by Judith Ehrlich and Rick Goldsmith. The film follows Daniel Ellsberg and explores the events leading up to the 1971 publication of the Pentagon Papers, which exposed the top-secret military history of the United States' involvement in Vietnam.

The film was shown on the PBS series POV in 2010, for which it earned a Peabody Award.

Reception

Critical response
In a review for The New York Times, Mike Hale writes that the film "conscientiously notes the viewpoints of those who believe that Mr. Ellsberg betrayed his country or his former colleagues at the Defense Department" and the filmmakers "concentrate on their portrait of Mr. Ellsberg, who emerges as a complex and difficult man whose principles, whether you agree with them or not, can’t be denied." Roger Ebert writes, "It is a skillful, well-made film, although, since Ellsberg is the narrator, it doesn't probe him very deeply. We see his version of himself."

Mick LaSalle writes in a review for The San Francisco Chronicle, "The film is packed with stories, from numerous talking heads, including Ellsberg. A wealth of information is conveyed with complete clarity." In a review for The Journal of American History, Stephen J. Whitfield notes "the most dangerous man in America" was a moniker "bestowed by Henry Kissinger, who had admired his Harvard University colleague's pioneering work in decision theory. But the film commits the unpardonable sin of leaving the title unexplained."

In a review for NPR, Mark Jenkins writes that the filmmakers "sometimes rely on Errol Morris-style reconstructions of events, which are less deft than Morris'. Distractingly, they also use sketchy animation for a few sequences." In a review for Variety, Ronnie Scheib writes,"While a present-day Ellsberg complains that the massive number of bombs dropped on Vietnam, which he repeatedly mentioned in press conferences back then, was never duly reported, Ehrlich and Goldsmith redress that silence with a bombardment of newsreel images of aerial destruction."

The Most Dangerous Man in America has an approval rating of 96% on review aggregator website Rotten Tomatoes, based on 56 reviews, and an average rating of 7.84/10. Metacritic assigned the film a weighted average score of 75 out of 100, based on 18 critics, indicating "generally favorable reviews".

Awards and nominations

Nominated
Academy Award 2010 – Best Documentary Feature

Won
International Documentary Film Festival Amsterdam
Special Jury Award
Palm Springs International Film Festival
Audience Award Best Documentary
National Board of Review, USA
Freedom of Expression Award
Mill Valley Film Festival, USA
Audience Award Best Documentary
San Luis Obispo International Film Festival, USA
Best In Fest
Boulder International Film Festival, USA
Best Feature Documentary
It's All True Film Festival, Brazil
Audience Award Best Documentary
Fresno Film Festival, USA
Audience Award Best Documentary
Sydney Film Festival, Australia
Best Documentary
Mendocino Film Festival, USA
Audience Choice Award Co-Winner
Docaviv Film Festival, Israel
Special Jury Mention
Traverse City Film Festival, USA
Audience Award Best Documentary
American Historical Association, USA
John O'Connor Film Award
History Makers Award, USA
Best History Production
Organization of American Historians, USA
Erik Barnouw Award

See also
 The Pentagon Papers (2003 film)
 The Post (2017 film)

References

External links
 Official film website
 
 The Most Dangerous Man in America at Kovno Communications 
 

2009 films
2009 documentary films
American documentary films
Documentary films about American politics
Documentary films about the Vietnam War
Pentagon Papers
Films about whistleblowing
Films about freedom of expression
Films about activists
Peabody Award-winning broadcasts
First Run Features films
2000s English-language films
2000s American films